Estoppel is a judicial device in common law legal systems whereby a court may prevent or "estop" a person from making assertions or from going back on his or her word; the person being sanctioned is "estopped". Estoppel may prevent someone from  bringing a particular claim.  Legal doctrines of estoppel are based in both common law and equity. 
It is also a concept in international law.

Types of estoppel
There are many different types of estoppel which can arise, but the common thread between them is that a person is restrained from asserting a particular position in law where it would be inequitable to do so. By way of illustration:

 If a landlord promises the tenant that he will not exercise his right to terminate a lease, and relying upon that promise the tenant spends money improving the premises, the doctrine of promissory estoppel may prevent the landlord from exercising a right to terminate, even though his promise might not otherwise have been legally binding as a contract. The landlord is precluded from asserting a specific right.
 If a person brings legal proceedings in one country claiming that a second person negligently injured them and the courts of that country determine that there was no negligence, then under the doctrine of issue estoppel the first person will not normally be able to argue before the courts of another country that the second person was negligent (whether in respect of the same claim or a related claim). The first person is precluded from asserting a specific claim.

Estoppel is an equitable doctrine. Accordingly, any person wishing to assert an estoppel must normally come to the court with "clean hands".

The doctrine of estoppel (which may prevent a party from asserting a right) is often confused with the doctrine of waiver (which relates to relinquishing a right once it has arisen). It also substantially overlaps with, but is distinct from, the equitable doctrine of laches.

Etymology and usage
The verb is estop, which comes from Middle English estoppen, itself borrowed from Old French estop(p)er, estouper, presumably from Vulgar Latin *stuppāre. 'to stop up with tow, caulk', from Latin stuppa, 'broken flax', from Ancient Greek stuppe, 'broken flax'. The noun form estoppel is based on the Old French estoupail, 'stopper, bung', a derivative of estouper.

Where a court finds that a party has done something warranting a form of estoppel, that party is said to be estopped from making certain related arguments or claiming certain related rights. The defendant is estopped from presenting the related defense, or the plaintiff is estopped from making the related argument against the defendant. Lord Coke stated, "It is called an estoppel or conclusion, because a man's own act or acceptance stoppeth or closeth up his mouth to allege or plead the truth."

Overview 
Estoppel is sometimes said to be a rule of evidence whereby a person is barred from leading evidence of a fact that has already been settled or they are otherwise precluded from asserting, but that may be an oversimplification. Firstly, although some estoppels relate to preventing a party from asserting facts, others relate to preventing a party from asserting a right or a claim. Secondly, under the conflict of laws in common law jurisdictions, matters of evidence are usually treated as procedural matters for the law of the local court (the ), whereas it is generally accepted that an estoppel may affect substantive rights and are therefore matters to be determined by the proper law (or ) that governs the particular issue.

There are many different types of estoppel that can arise under common law legal systems. It has been judicially noted on more than one occasion that the link between them is often somewhat tenuous. Treitel on Contracts notes that "unconscionability ... provides the link between them", but they nevertheless have "separate requirements and different terrains of application". The courts have long abandoned an attempt to create a single general underlying rationale or principle:

The plea of estoppel is often closely connected with the plea of waiver, the object of both being to ensure bona fides in day-to-day transactions. It is also related to the doctrines of variation and election. It is applied in many areas of contract law, including insurance, banking, and employment. In English law, the concept of legitimate expectation in the realm of administrative law and judicial review is estoppel's counterpart in public law.

Promissory estoppel is often applied where there is a promise or an agreement made without consideration. When used as a defense by a defendant it is sometimes called a "shield", and when used affirmatively by a plaintiff it is sometimes called a "sword". It is most commonly used as a shield, with some commentators stating that it can only be used as a shield, although this varies with jurisdictions.

Examples 
Estoppel can be understood by considering examples such as the following:

A city entered into a contract with another party. The contract stated that it had been reviewed by the city's counsel and that the contract was proper. Estoppel applied to estop the city from claiming the contract was invalid.
A creditor unofficially informs a debtor that the creditor forgives the debt between them. Even if such forgiveness is not formally documented, the creditor may be estopped from changing its mind and seeking to collect the debt, because that change would be unfair.
A landlord informs a tenant that rent has been reduced, for example, because there was construction or a lapse in utility services. If the tenant relies on this statement in choosing to remain in the premises, the landlord could be estopped from collecting the full rent.

Types 
Some types of estoppel under English, Australian, and American laws are as follows:

In civil cases 
Reliance-based estoppels: These involve one party relying on something the other party has done or said. The party who performed/spoke is the one who is estopped. This category is discussed below.
Estoppel by record: This frequently arises as issue/cause of action estoppel or judicial estoppel where the orders or judgments made in previous legal proceedings prevent the parties from relitigating the same issues or causes of action.
Estoppel by deed: Situations where rules of evidence prevent a litigant from denying the truth of what was said or done.
Estoppel by silence or acquiescence: Estoppel that prevents a person from asserting something when he had the right and opportunity to do so earlier, and such silence put another person at a disadvantage.
Laches: Estoppel after a litigant deliberately and avoidably delays an action so as to disadvantage an adversary.

In American criminal cases 
Entrapment by estoppel: In American criminal law, although "ignorance of the law is no excuse" is a principle which generally holds for traditional (older common law) crimes, courts sometimes allow this excuse as a defense, when defendant can show they reasonably relied on an interpretation of the law by the public official(s) charged with enforcement or interpretation of that law, such as a regulatory official (even if that official's interpretation is later determined to be wrong). The defense is based on "fairness" principles in the Fifth Amendment. It generally involves determination of fact, not of law, except as to determination of whether the interpreting government official had the legal status asserted by the defense.

Reliance-based estoppels 
Reliance-based estoppels (at English law) include:
by representation of fact, where one person asserts the truth of a set of facts to another;
promissory estoppel, where one person makes a promise to another, but there is no enforceable contract; and
proprietary estoppel, where the parties are litigating the title to land.
Both Halsbury's and Spencer Bower (see below) describe these three estoppels collectively as estoppels by representation.  More simply, one party must say or do something and see the other party rely on what is said or done to change behavior.

All reliance-based estoppels require the victimised party to show both inducement and detrimental reliance, i.e.:
 there must be evidence to show that the representor actually intended the victim to act on the representation or promise, or
 the victim must satisfy the court that it was reasonable for him or her to act on the relevant representation or promise, and
 what the victim did must either have been reasonable, or
 the victim did what the representor intended, and
 the victim would suffer a loss or detriment if the representor was allowed to deny what was said or done—detriment is measured at the time when the representor proposes to deny the representation or withdraw the promise, not at the time when either was made, and
 in all the circumstances, the behavior of the representor is such that it would be "unconscionable" to allow him or her to resile.

Simply put, promissory estoppel has four necessary elements which the plaintiff must prove:
 there was a promise
 that was reasonably relied upon
 resulting in legal detriment to the promisee
 justice requires enforcement of the promise

Estoppel by representation of fact and promissory estoppel are mutually exclusive: the former is based on a representation of existing fact (or of mixed fact and law), while the latter is based on a promise not to enforce some pre-existing right (i.e. it expresses an intention as to the future). A promissory estoppel operates only between parties who, at the time of the representation, were in an existing relationship, while this is not a requirement for estoppel by representation of fact.

The test for unconscionability in the English and Australian courts takes many factors into account, including the behavior, state of mind and circumstances of the parties. Generally, the following eight factors are determinative:
how the promise/representation and reliance upon it were induced;
the content of the promise/representation;
the relative knowledge of the parties;
the parties' relative interest in the relevant activities in reliance;
the nature and context of the parties' relationship;
the parties' relative strength of position;
the history of the parties' relationship; and
the steps, if any, taken by the promisor/representor to ensure he has not caused preventable harm.

But in Cobbe v Yeoman's Row, Lord Scott of Foscote stated the following:

England and Wales

Estoppel by representation of fact 
In English law, estoppel by representation of fact is a term coined by Spencer Bower. This species of estoppel is also referred to as "common law estoppel by representation" in Halsbury's Laws of England, vol 16(2), 2003 reissue.

Spencer Bower defines estoppel by representation of fact as follows:

A second definition comes from Sean Wilken and Theresa Villiers:

A representation can be made by words or conduct. Although the representation must be clear and unambiguous, a representation can be inferred from silence where there is a duty to speak or from negligence where a duty of care has arisen. Under English law, estoppel by representation of fact usually acts as a defence, though it may act in support of a cause of action or counterclaim.

Equitable estoppel 

Under English and Australian legal systems, estoppels in equity include promissory and proprietary estoppels, described below.  (Contrast with estoppel by representation, which is a claim (under the English system) at law.)

Proprietary estoppel 

In English law, proprietary estoppel is distinct from promissory estoppel. Proprietary estoppel is not a concept in American law, but a similar result is often reached under the general doctrine of promissory estoppel.

Traditionally, proprietary estoppel arose in relation to rights to use the land of the owner, and possibly in connection with disputed transfers of ownership. Although proprietary estoppel was only traditionally available in disputes affecting title to real property, it has now gained limited acceptance in other areas of law. Proprietary estoppel is closely related to the doctrine of constructive trust.

Fry J summarized the five elements for proprietary estoppel as:

 the claimant
 made a mistake as to his legal rights (typically because the actual owner attempted to convey the property, but the transfer is invalid or ineffective for some reason);
 did some act of reliance;
 the defendant
 knows of the existence of a legal right which he (the defendant) possesses, and which is inconsistent with the right claimed by the claimant;
 knows of the claimant's mistaken belief; and
 encouraged the claimant in his act of reliance.

Example: A father promised a house to his son who took possession and spent a large sum of money improving the property, but the father never actually transferred the house to the son. Upon the father's death, the son claimed to be the equitable owner. The court found the testamentary trustees (as representatives of the deceased father's estate) were estopped from denying the son's proprietary interest, and ordered them to convey the land to the son.

Promissory estoppel 
The doctrine of promissory estoppel prevents one party from withdrawing a promise made to a second party if the latter has reasonably relied on that promise.

A promise made without consideration is generally not enforceable. It is known as a bare or gratuitous promise. Thus, if a car salesman promises a potential buyer not to sell a certain car over the weekend, but does so, the promise cannot be enforced. But should the car salesman accept from the potential buyer even one penny in consideration for the promise, the promise will be enforceable in court by the potential buyer. Estoppel extends the court's purview even to cases where there is no consideration, though it is generally not a 'sword': not a basis on which to initiate a lawsuit.

In English jurisprudence, the doctrine of promissory estoppel was first developed in Hughes v Metropolitan Railway Co [1877] but was lost for some time until it was resurrected by Denning J in the controversial case of Central London Property Trust Ltd v High Trees House Ltd.

Promissory estoppel requires:
an unequivocal promise by words or conduct
evidence that there is a change in position of the promisee as a result of the promise (reliance but not necessarily to their detriment)
inequity if the promisor were to go back on the promise

In general, estoppel is "a shield not a sword"—it cannot be used as the basis of an action on its own. It also does not extinguish rights. In High Trees the plaintiff company was able to restore payment of full rent from early 1945, and could have restored the full rent at any time after the initial promise was made provided a suitable period of notice had been given. In this case, the estoppel was applied to a "negative promise", that is, one where a party promises not to enforce full rights.

Estoppel is an equitable (as opposed to common law) construct and its application is therefore discretionary. In the case of D & C Builders v Rees the courts refused to recognise a promise to accept a part payment of £300 on a debt of £482 on the basis that it was extracted by duress. In Combe v Combe Denning elaborated on the equitable nature of estoppel by refusing to allow its use as a "sword" by an ex-wife to extract funds from the destitute husband.

The general rule is that when one party agrees to accept a lesser sum in full payment of a debt, the debtor has given no consideration, and so the creditor is still entitled to claim the debt in its entirety. This is not the case if the debtor offers payment at an earlier date than was previously agreed, because the benefit to the creditor of receiving payment early can be thought of as consideration for the promise to waive the rest of the debt. This is the rule formulated in Pinnel's Case, and affirmed in Foakes v Beer.

The decision of the Court of Appeal in Collier v P & MJ Wright (Holdings) Ltd suggests that the doctrine of promissory estoppel can now operate to mitigate the harshness of this common law rule. Moreover, Arden LJ held that allowing a creditor to renege on his promise to forebear seeking the balance of a debt in return for part payment would be, in and of itself, inequitable. Therefore, the only reliance that the promisee must demonstrate is the actual making of the part payment. This approach has been criticised as doing violence to the principle set down in Hughes and the extent to which the other members of the Court, namely Longmore LJ, agreed with it is uncertain.

United States

Equitable estoppel 
Equitable estoppel is the American counterpart to estoppel by representation. Its elements are summarized as:
Facts misrepresented or concealed
Knowledge of true facts
Fraudulent intent
Inducement and reliance
Injury to complainant
Clear, concise, unequivocal proof of actus (not by implication)

For example, in Aspex Eyewear v. Clariti Eyewear, eyeglass frame maker Aspex sued competitor Clariti for patent infringement. Aspex waited three years, without responding to a request that it list the infringed patent claims, before asserting its patent in litigation. During this period, Clariti expanded its marketing and sales of the products. The Federal Circuit found that Aspex misled Clariti to believe it would not enforce its patent, and thus estopped Aspex from proceeding with the suit.

Another example of equitable estoppel is the case of Sakharam Ganesh Pandit, an Indian emigrant and lawyer who was granted American citizenship in 1914 due to his designation as "white". Subsequently, Pandit bought property, was admitted to the California bar, married a white woman, and renounced his rights to property and inheritance in British India. Following the Supreme Court case United States v. Thind, which found that Indians were considered non-white, and in which Pandit represented the applicant, Bhagat Singh Thind, the US government moved to strip Pandit of his "illegally procured" citizenship. Pandit successfully challenged the denaturalization, arguing that under equitable estoppel, he would be unjustly harmed by losing his citizenship, as it would cause him to become stateless, lose his profession as a lawyer, and make his marriage illegal. In U.S. v. Pandit, the U.S. Court of Appeals for the Ninth Circuit upheld Pandit's citizenship, ending denaturalization processes against him and other Indian-Americans.

Promissory estoppel 
In many jurisdictions of the United States, promissory estoppel is an alternative to consideration as a basis for enforcing a promise. It is also sometimes called detrimental reliance.

The American Law Institute in 1932 included the principle of estoppel into § 90 of the Restatement of Contracts, stating:

However:

Suppose that B goes to a store and sees a sign that the price of a radio is $10. B tells the shopkeeper that he will get the money and come back later that day to purchase it; there is no discussion of price. The shopkeeper says that when B returns, he will welcome B as a customer—unless he sells all three of his radios first. Hearing this, B goes and sells his watch for $10 (it was really worth $15, but since B wanted the money right away, he chose not to wait for the best price). When B returns, the sign says $11, and the owner tells B that he has raised the price. In equity, can you argue that the shopkeeper is estopped by conduct? B relied upon the implied representation that a radio would be sold for $10 when he returned with the money; B has sold his watch at a discount, to his detriment. (This element would be absent if B sold the watch at the market price.) But the shopkeeper did not guarantee to hold one of the radios against the possibility of B's return nor did they agree a fixed price.

In some common-law jurisdictions, a promise by the shopkeeper to hold a specific radio would create a binding contract, even if B had to go for the money. A promise to pay the owner in the future is good consideration if it is made in exchange for a promise to sell a specific radio (one from three is probably sufficiently specific): one promise in exchange for a second promise creates equal value. So the shopkeeper's actual words and knowledge are critical to deciding whether either a contract or an estoppel arises.

The drafters of the Second Restatement debated how to calculate the amount of damages flowing from a promissory estoppel, using the following example: A young man's uncle promises to give him $1,000 to buy a car. The young man buys a car for $500, but the uncle refuses to pay any money. Is the young man entitled to $1,000 (the amount promised), or merely $500 (the amount he actually lost)? The Restatement states that "The remedy granted for breach may be limited as justice requires"—leaving quantification to the discretion of the court.

Other estoppels

Pais 
Estoppel in pais (literally "by act of notoriety", or "solemn formal act") is the historical root of common law estoppel by representation and equitable estoppel. The terms Estoppel in pais and equitable estoppel are used interchangeably in American law.

Convention 
Estoppel by convention in English law (also known as estoppel by agreement) occurs where two parties negotiate or operate a contract but make a mistake. If they share an assumption, belief, or understanding of the contract's interpretation or legal effect, then they are bound by it, if:

They both knew the other had the same belief, and
They both based their subsequent dealings on those beliefs.

Estoppel by convention is most commonly invoked if one party wishes to rely on pre-contract negotiation as an aid to construction of the contract.

It is debatable whether estoppel by convention is a separate estoppel doctrine, or merely a case of reliance-based estoppel (estoppel by representation would be its most frequent form), or of the rule of interpretation that, where words in a contract are ambiguous, one always interprets those words so as to give effect to the actual intentions of the parties even if that would not be the usual legal outcome (see Amalgamated Investment and Property Co Ltd v Texas Commerce International Bank Ltd [1982] QB 84).

Acquiescence 

Estoppel by acquiescence may arise when one person gives a legal warning to another based on some clearly asserted facts or legal principle, and the other does not respond within "a reasonable period of time". By acquiescing, the other person is generally considered to have lost the legal right to assert the contrary.

As an example, suppose that Jill has been storing her car on Jack's land with no contract between them. Jack sends a registered letter to Jill's legal address, stating: "I am no longer willing to allow your car to stay here for free. Please come get your car, or make arrangements to pay me rent for storing it. If you do not do so, within 30 days, I will consider the car abandoned and will claim ownership of it. If you need more time to make arrangements, please contact me within 30 days, and we can work something out." If Jill does not respond, she may be said to have relinquished her ownership of the car, and estoppel by acquiescence may prevent any court from invalidating Jack's actions of registering the car in his name and using it as his own.

Contractual 

The law relating to contractual estoppel (in English law) was summarised in :

Deed 

Estoppel by deed is a rule of evidence arising from the status of a contract signed under seal—such agreements, called deeds, are more strictly enforced than ordinary contracts and the parties are expected to take greater care to verify the contents before signing them. Hence, once signed, all statements of fact (usually found in the opening recital which sets out the reason(s) for making the deed) are conclusive evidence against the parties who are estopped from asserting otherwise.

Conflict estoppel 
"[O]ne who by his speech or conduct has induced another to act in a particular manner ought not be permitted to adopt an inconsistent position, attitude or course of conduct may not be adopted to loss or injury of another". For example, as between two or more claimants, a party that takes multiple and inconsistent legal positions is estopped to assert its positions against another consistent and certain claim, i.e. preferential treatment for certain over uncertain claims.

Issue estoppel

Issue estoppel (more commonly known as issue preclusion) prevents, in some cases, an issue that has already been litigated and decided on the merits from being re-litigated, even when the parties are different.  In the world of crime, some cases have achieved notoriety, e.g. in the Birmingham Six saga, the House of Lords ruled in Hunter v Chief Constable of the West Midlands Police (1982) that issue estoppel applied. Lord Diplock said:

A variant of issue estoppel also precludes a party from bringing a claim in subsequent proceedings which ought properly to have been brought as part of earlier legal proceedings.

In other countries

Australia 
The doctrine of promissory estoppel was adopted into Australian law in Legione v Hateley. However, the plaintiffs were unsuccessful in that case because the reliance was unreasonable and the promise not unequivocal.

Australian law has now gone beyond the position espoused in the English High Trees case, to cases where there is no pre-existing legal relationship between the two parties, and promissory estoppel can be wielded as a "sword", not just as a "shield". Mason CJ and Wilson J in Waltons Stores (Interstate) Ltd v Maher held that if estoppel is proven, it gives rise to an equity in favour of the plaintiff, and the court will do the minimum equity that is just in the circumstances. From this case, it is also possible for the promise to come from silence or inaction.

Stated by Brennan J in Waltons Stores: 

Although there is some debate as to whether "unconscionability" is an element that English courts need to take into account when considering estoppel by representation of fact, the Australian courts clearly do.  This element is satisfied if one party encourages the other party to create assumptions that lead to reliance.

Today, the principle of estoppel may give birth to an enforceable obligation even without a consideration under the following conditions:
 promise
 dishonest behaviour of the promisor
 special relationship between the promisor and the promisee, (e.g., duty of information);
 irreversible change of position on the part of the promisee

When enforcing an estoppel, Australian courts will look to the impact that enforcement will have on others, especially third parties. Relief in estoppel thus remains discretionary, and will not always be granted based on the expectation of the plaintiff.

The status of estoppel by representation of fact is less clear in Australia. Two seminal decisions purport to fuse common law and equitable estoppels into a single unified doctrine, but the New South Wales Court of Appeal continues to treat estoppel by representation at common law as distinct from equitable estoppel.  This can be significant in deciding which court has jurisdiction to adjudicate on the issue.

Whilst there also exists a doctrine of proprietary estoppel, the High Court of Australia merged this doctrine with the doctrine of promissory estoppel by virtue of their similar criteria.

Nonetheless, authority for the doctrine of proprietary estoppel indicates that if a landlord allows a licensee to expend money on the land under an expectation created or encouraged by the landlord that he/she will be able to remain there, and the licensee suffers a detriment in relying on that expectation, an equity arises in the licensee such as to entitle him/her to stay. Where a proprietary estoppel is found to exist, the court does not have to grant the plaintiff a proprietary interest in the land subject to the dispute. It may instead make an order that the plaintiff receive equitable compensation.

India 
Section 115 of the Indian Evidence Act defines estoppel: "When one person has, by his declaration, act or omission, intentionally caused or permitted another person to believe a thing to be true and to act upon such belief, neither he nor his representative shall be allowed, in any suit or proceeding between himself and such person or his representative, to deny the truth of that thing."

So, for instance, if A intentionally and falsely leads B to believe that certain land belongs to A, and thereby induces B to buy and pay for it, and only later does A acquire the land, then A is not allowed to argue to void the sale on the ground that, at the time of the sale, he had no title.

The doctrine of estoppel is based on the principle that consistency in word and action imparts certainty and honesty to human affairs. If a person makes a representation to another, on the faith of which the latter acts, to his prejudice, the former cannot recant the representation.

However, estoppel has no application to representations made regarding the fundamental rights conferred by the Constitution of India, the source of all laws, which exists not only to benefit individuals but to secure collective rights. Thus, no one can barter away the freedoms conferred upon him by the Constitution. A concession made by him in a proceeding, whether under a mistake of law or otherwise, that he does not possess or will not enforce any particular fundamental right, cannot estop him, as enforcing estoppel would defeat the purpose of the Constitution.

See also 
 Acquiescence
 Assignor estoppel
 Collateral estoppel (US)
 De facto corporation and corporation by estoppel (US)
 Direct estoppel
 Estoppel by deed (US)
 Judicial estoppel
 Licensee estoppel
 McDonald v Attorney-General
 Prosecution history estoppel, also known as file-wrapper estoppel (US)
 res judicata

Notes

External links 

 Proprietary estoppel
 Tenant Estoppel Agreements
 Promissory Estoppel

 
Contract law
Equity (law)
Equitable defenses
French legal terminology
Legal doctrines and principles